The voiced alveolar lateral affricate is a type of consonantal sound, used in some spoken languages.

Features
Features of the voiced alveolar lateral affricate:

Occurrence
Voiced alveolar lateral affricates are rare. In the Nguni languages  occurs after nasals:  is pronounced , with an epenthetic stop, in at least Xhosa and Zulu.

References

Bibliography

External links
 

Affricates
Alveolar consonants
Lateral consonants
Pulmonic consonants
Voiced oral consonants